The 1973 St. Louis mayoral election was held on April 3, 1973 to elect the mayor of St. Louis, Missouri. It saw the election of John Poelker and the defeat of incumbent mayor Alfonso Cervantes in the Democratic primary.

The election was preceded by party primaries on March 6.

Democratic primary

General election

References

Mayoral elections in St. Louis
St. Louis
1973 in Missouri